Looi Loon Teik (born 15 February 1945) is a Malaysian former footballer. Loon Teik represented Kedah FA in the 1970s and early 1980s during his football career. He also played for Malaysia national team. He competed in the men's tournament at the 1972 Summer Olympics and playing all three group games.

In 2004, he was inducted in Olympic Council of Malaysia's Hall of Fame for 1972 Summer Olympics football team.

References

External links
 

1945 births
Living people
Malaysian footballers
Malaysia international footballers
Olympic footballers of Malaysia
Footballers at the 1972 Summer Olympics
Place of birth missing (living people)
Association football wingers
People from Kedah
Malaysian sportspeople of Chinese descent